Shevyryov or Shevyrev are the surname of the following people
Pyotr Yakovlevich Shevyryov (1863–1887), Russian revolutionary
Stepan Shevyryov (1806–1864), Russian historian an poet
Valeri Shevyryov (born in 1974), Russian footballer